Cerritos College is a public community college in Norwalk, California. It offers degrees and certificates in 87 areas of study in nine divisions.

History 
The college was founded in 1955. It was named after Rancho Los Cerritos, a local ranch in the 19th century. In turn the college was part of the inspiration for the renaming of the neighboring city of Dairy Valley to Cerritos. The district covers Artesia, Bellflower, Cerritos, Downey, Norwalk, La Mirada, and Hawaiian Gardens.

Originally, classrooms were rented in the now defunct Excelsior High School in September 1956. On July 24, 1957, the Cerritos Junior College District won the case against Dairy Valley (now Cerritos) to use the undeveloped land as an educational site. In September 1959, the college moved from Excelsior High School to the current site.

Organization and administration 
The founder was Ralph Burnight of Redlands, a resident of Bellflower and superintendent of the Excelsior School District.
The current college president is Dr. Jose Fierro.

Campus modernization 
On February 15, 2017, the school opened two new buildings: a new Math and Computer Information Sciences building, and a Fine Arts complex. Together, the new facilities cost over $55 million and were funded by Measure G bond dollars.

Housing 
On June 11, 2020, Cerritos became the first California community college to have housing for students without a place to live or with uncertain housing.

Athletics

Notable alumni

 Bob Apodaca – Colorado Rockies retired pitching coach
 Marcelo Balboa – US National soccer team captain
 Rod Barajas – Los Angeles Dodgers catcher / San Diego Padres Quality Control Coach
 Bret Barberie – Major League Baseball player
 Mike Benjamin – Major League Baseball infielder
 Corey Bojorquez – Cleveland Browns punter
 Rich Camarillo – former New England Patriots player
 John Corbett – actor
 Eric Draper – personal photographer for US President George W. Bush
 Fou Fonoti – former American football player
 John Force – NHRA Funny car driver
 Joe Gibbs – former Washington Redskins head coach
 George Horton – University of Oregon former baseball coach
 T. J. Houshmandzadeh – former Cincinnati Bengals wide receiver
 Brian Hunter – Major League Baseball former infielder
 Kareem Larrimore – former Dallas Cowboys cornerback
 Bobby Magallanes – Atlanta Braves assistant hitting coach
 Bobby McFerrin – musician
 Houston McTear – former world record sprinter
 Louie Medina – Major League Baseball
 Steve Mooshagian – American football player and college football coach, National Football League coach
 Grace Napolitano – U.S. Representative
 Emanuel Newton – (attended) professional mixed martial artist
 Tom Nieto – Major League Baseball former catcher, coach
 Damacio Page – state champion wrestler; current mixed martial artist, formerly for the WEC and the UFC
 Elijhaa Penny – National Football League player
 Tupe Peko – National Football League former player
 Bao Quach – wrestler; Professional MMA fighter
 D. J. Reed – New York Jets defensive back
 Rodney Allen Rippy – actor
 Lorenzo Romar – former Washington Huskies head basketball coach
 Bubby Rossman – major league baseball pitcher for the Philadelphia Phillies
 John Saul – horror author
 Jeff Tedford – Fresno State Bulldogs head coach (note: Tedford graduated from California State University, Fresno State)
 Jim Vellone - former Minnesota Vikings guard
 Dusty Wathan – third base coach for the Philadelphia Phillies
 Herb Welch – former New York Giants player
 Ray Wersching – former San Francisco 49ers kicker
 Craig Worthington – former Major League Baseball third baseman
 Kirk Jellerson – college football coach
 Demetrin Veal – Tennessee Titans former defensive tackle
 Bobby Lane – former American football player
 Broderick Thompson – former National Football League player
 Tom Tolbert – radio sports talk host and former NBA player
 Rhamondre Stevenson – New England Patriots running back
 A.J. McKee – former Bellator MMA featherweight champion
 Ron Yary – former Minnesota Vikings offensive tackle, member of Pro Football Hall of Fame
 Han Ye-seul – South Korean actress
 Steve Seungjun Yoo – Korean-American singer
 Jim Zorn – former Seattle Seahawks quarterback and Washington Redskins head coach

References

External links
 

 
California Community Colleges
Cerritos, California
Educational institutions established in 1955
Norwalk, California
Schools accredited by the Western Association of Schools and Colleges
Universities and colleges in Los Angeles County, California
1955 establishments in California